Muhammad Iqbal (1877–1938) was a prolific writer who authored many works covering various fields and genres such as poetry, philosophy and mysticism. He expressed his ideas in many forms and this article deals with his educational philosophy. His philosophy has tremendous significance not only for Pakistan educational system, but also for the entire world. His basic concept of education is based on the teaching of the Quran. To him the superior, reliable and faultless source of knowledge is only this one. His whole educational thought is based and revolves on his concept of Khudi. He had a unique concept of education that carries the vital significance being the contribution of both modern and ancient thoughts. His well balanced thoughts are based upon the strong roots of Islamic teachings on one side and being progressive and coping with the modern scientific age on the other side. He has been very categorical in expressing his views about the education, its nature, and philosophy in his poetical works, articles and speeches. He also wrote various letters to different people and discussed the educational phenomenon in detail.

Iqbal was against of that educational system which was implemented in Indian subcontinents under the influence of colonial rule. His vision was not limited to the current deteriorated condition of his age, but also holds solutions to the prevalent problems of the Muslim societies. He was of the opinion that education is primarily a social process and this process constitutes one of the main dimensions of any philosophy of education. He believed that the material world is a reality and one can achieve the spiritual and moral development while committed with the material world. He also subscribed to the view that there must be harmony between the material and spiritual elements in man, which educational theory should consider. He valued intellect, but he criticized contemporary thought for overstressing it at the expense of intuition or love. From Iqbal's writings, the good man is creative and original, for creativity is the most precious and distinctive gift of man. He must be able to use his intelligence to harness the forces of nature for his own good and also to increase his knowledge and power. In addition, the good man lives his life in the name of the Lord, dedicating his powers and knowledge to working out his purpose and thereby deserving himself for the position of God's vicegerent on earth. In relation with the aims of education, Iqbal, emphasized the proper development of the individuality of man and maintained that an individual should be exposed to all kinds of formative and challenging experiences. He underscored the importance of freedom, which allowed for experimentation with the environment, for the exercise of choice and discrimination in the use of methods and substance, and for learning by direct, first-hand experience. Despite his emphasis on the individual, Iqbal did not ignore the role of the community and its culture in the give-and-take dynamics with the individual.

Background 
Mohammad Iqbal philosophy has tremendous significance not only for Pakistan educational system, but also for the entire world. Iqbal is not only a renowned thinker on education; he, in fact, practiced his thought. He taught in the institutions of higher learning both in the sub-continent and European world. His contribution as an active member of All India Muhammadan Educational Conference, Anjuman-i-Himayat-i-Islam, Punjab Educational Conference and other educational forums further established him as an eminent educationist. According to an eminent educationist Saleem aptly interprets Iqbal's concept of individual and community. To him, the overriding objectives of both (the community and the individual) are the same, that is, eradication of evil and establishment of a just moral order in this world. There is, so to say, natural cooperation, rather than inimical confrontations between the community and the individual. The nucleus of Iqbal's theory of education on which the rest of his thought structure builds is the concept of good will (khudi) that strengthens the individual's innate powers. In this sense, education (talimo-tarbiyah) is to unfold the hidden best potentials of the individual's and to channel those to attain goodness, Educationist about change for goodness. In this perspective, if an individual or a nation tries to withdraw from struggle or become passive, their individuality (khudi) will lose color or strength and their talents will remain unrealized. For achieving the aims of education, Iqbal considers curriculum as the most important element of the educational process. His curriculum model is based on the following points. The foundation of education is to examine and critique the world research, and finally develop its own viewpoint. Iqbal states that “our duty is to carefully watch the progress of human, and to maintain an independent critical attitude towards it, Education system structured on mere instinctual needs without purification (on the criteria of absolute knowledge) will produce a mal-adjusted and split-personality. Only meeting the right and just natural needs of spirit (ruh), mind (aql), and body (jasad) will develop a balanced healthy personality. Without axiological emphasis, education would be either useless or destructive. In this perspective, education is never value-free. On the whole, education is holistic, harmonious and balanced only if it is spread over the whole life i.e. life-here to life-hereafter. Education advocating for mere life-here having no link with hereafter is distorted and faulty. Iqbal's philosophy and theory of education coordinate the whole process of education, particularly its four essential elements viz. (a) aims of education; (b) curriculum; (c) teacher's role and methodology; and (d) evaluation.

The aims of education in accordance with Iqbal's philosophy are to Produce a true personality (maumin) by strengthening his unique individuality (khudi) in order to play his destined role in the world to meet the diversified challenges of all times. The theme of Iqbal's thoughts of education which is the remaining of his that paradigm which constructs the perception of positive will (ego) that combine strongly the individuals inner self power. In this sense knowledge is to disclose the hidden potentialities of the individual and nationalized them for achieving excellence, The purpose of education is to inspect and critic the world research and lastly to organize its own thoughts. According to Iqbal human duties are to cautiously see the zenith of human beings conception and to retain a liberal critical behavior towards it.

Educational Aims 
Education aims are primarily a phase of values. They are conscious or unconscious value judgments. These judgments involve thinking in metaphysics and epistemology. Educational aims take their root from philosophy. Iqbal's philosophy is the philosophy of the self. He prizes and stresses self or individuality. Hence in Iqbal's view the highest or ultimate aim of all educational effort as well as other social efforts is to develop strengthen the individuality of all persons. In other words, the ultimate aim of the man is his life as well as in education is the actualization and realization of the open, infinite possibilities within, without and before him. The highest ideal is a continued life with the highest quality of knowledge, power, perfection, goodness, vision and creativity. But the ideal at this level is not a fixed one. As one acquires more of the qualities of the ideal, it shifts its place to a still higher level. It does not mean only the development of the inherent possibilities of man, but in a great measure the individual's power to absorb into himself, for the reconstruction of his experience, power, personality, and the enrichment of his life, the influence of the universe external to him. Sense, reason, intellect, and intelligence are the evolved instruments for this purpose. Hence according to Iqbal, the cultivation of any of the faculties like reason, intellect, and intelligence is not the aim of education; rather they are the means of the ideal of continuation and enrichment of life. According to Iqbal, the statement the ultimate aim and the description of its various aspects into objectives education as continuous life of good health, perfection, power, knowledge, goodness, vision, creative and original activity, and other values of his philosophical system for the development of individuality would not be enough. He recognizes the need for more proximate, immediate and specific objectives which when realized become resource to achieve the ultimate aim with more vigor and enthusiasm. He encourages freedom of thought and originality for the achievement of something unique.

The actualization of specific objectives becomes a means and refers to immediate while the ultimate aim. The value of ultimate aim as the development of individuality is supreme because, through suggestion and direction, it controls the selection of more proximate aims, and their execution. The development of individuality can be accelerated by the formulation of new creative purposes and objectives which always determine the direction of man's activity and evolution. Hence by means of motive force of unceasing and creative desires and ideals the individual builds his selfhood, culture, and institutions. Education would defeat its purpose of the development of free, creative and unique personalities if the educational system discourages the formation of new ideals and objectives. These objectives according to Iqbal, grow out of dynamic, forward - moving activity of the individual in relation to his environment, culture heritage, ongoing experience and projected ideals. The objectives depend also upon the nature of the pupil, social institutions, contemporary life with due regard to the activities of children and adults for the development of their personalities and character and preparation for vocation. They emerge from the present experience and man's problems of meeting the constant need of dynamic environment; his desire to achieve ideals by changing the environment to his needs with the help and direction of his will, intelligence , and valuable surviving traditions and principles of the past. Our duty is carefully to watch the progress of human thought, and maintain an independent critical attitude towards it".

Growth and development of individuality in active and purposeful participation in life, through the agency of education, requires a material and cultural environment. There is need of intense and manifold activity on the part of growing individual which must be carried out in vital contact with the whole of his material and cultural environment. The social setting provides the individual with such a whole some environment. Man doesn’t live to himself alone. On the contrary basis, he lives among his fellows in a social structure. He realizes his ideals in participation in not simply as it is, but also as it is becoming and ought to be. Iqbal's concept of an ideal society is a democracy of more or less unique individuals towards which they all should move progressively for their mutual rejuvenation. Such a social organized environment, to Iqbal's mind, is not the end but the means to each individual's effort to realize his idea of his unique personality. Of course, society does not exist for individual's selfishness but for mutual help through cooperative effort of all its members. Education develops individuality by bringing about a dynamic and progressive interaction between the individual and the society with the object of adjusting them to each other. Mohammad Iqbal, in spite of his learning and wide reading, is no mere echo of other men's ideas, but is distinctly an original thinker.

To realize the broad educational aims and values as framed by Iqbal, the teacher will have to plan specific objectives for classroom activities. Of course, when these aims and values are expanded to this length a detailed, the merge with the curriculum its self. According to Iqbal, then, the specific objectives will not be one or many in a specific number but a multitude as framed by teachers and pupils. Iqbal would like these aims to be based on democratic principles. they should not be enforced from outside. The pupil and teacher should be free to make, choose and accept them. In other words, they should be meaningful to those who use them. Iqbal would disapprove of the determination of aims of one individual or group by another individual or group, because he has great regard of the individuality of each person and even urges him to make his purposes and ideals himself.

Further, aims arise out of the actual and concrete situations and are selected by the teacher and the pupil from among the various alternatives. The end of these intelligently projected ideals gives an insight or vision and becomes an instrument in guiding both pupil and teacher in reaching that end by helping them consider and adjust the means, and by suggesting the order a procedure to be followed in using the means. Since aims are values, they provide motivating forces to achieve the ideal put forth, and also the basis for the evaluation of the ideal when it is achieved. Further according to Iqbal, his aims and values are a set of principles, and are useful to the educator as well as the educated, not as aims, but as suggestions for their guidance in keeping an overall balance of all the values that may be involved. Iqbal's philosophy subscribes to that kind of proximate educational aims which are not fixed, static, and immutable, but which should be flexible and subject to the continual reconstruction. In universe of change and evolution the educational aims should be tentative and must shift with rest of the scenery of changing individuals and their environments. They should be constantly made and remade be an outgrowth of practical changing situations. Hence Iqbal's educational aims do not consist in maintaining a status quo because he preaches a life of ideals and purposes, and ceaseless effort to realize them. The desires, objectives, purposes and ideals are not mere impulses, because one's acting on impulse does not become an activity with a purpose until one tries to see the means at one's command, the reasonableness of the objective, and probable outcome of the activity. One may note that educational aims and their outcomes are not the same or identical in their meaning. The former are what one tries to do and the latter are what one actually succeeds in performing. Here one perceives how aims change in the process of actualization, and the scope of uncertainty of result they are expected to bring. It also points towards the importance of careful formulation and use of aims to manage the educative process with intelligence and vision which Iqbal emphasizes.

Concept Of Individuality 

No one can develop any intelligent theory of education without consciously postulating some conception of nature of the individuals to be educated and of their destinies. In this regard Iqbal outlines the education process when reduced to its most elementary terms, is the fact of a living human organism in constant interaction, which keeps on changing and growing as a result of this continuous intercourse. Iqbal, therefore, states that like a philosopher, the educator must enquire into the characteristic nature of these two terms of activity, the individual and the environment, which ultimately determine the solution of all problems. It is a question of ego or individuality which is the central ideas of his philosophy. It is therefore absolutely necessary to examine his doctrine of individuality because, of its importance in his system of thought but, also because modern psychology, biology and educational theory have emphasized on these aspects and, recent mass movements and the rise of dictatorships have given this problem an increased political significance. Modern political, industrial and scientific movements have generally tended to suppress individuality in various ways and, therefore, social thinkers who are concerned about the preservation of the values of the human personality are naturally preoccupied, with the problematic of reasserting the primacy of individuality of life. Iqbal as a humanist was sensitive to all the possibilities of growth and expansion open to the human spirit. He devoted much of his thinking and interpretation of thought to this problem. In other words, it was central and a basis of the entire organization of life. He disagreed with many philosophers including Hegel because these people believed that, the highest objective and ideal of man was to lose his individual identity. Of all living creatures, man has achieved the highest measure of individuality and is most conscious of his own reality. He has stated that the bold and fearless self – realization runs right through his works and philosophy, and regards the cultivation of individuality as the highest goal of all social and educational effort. Our educational system, with but few exceptions, is mainly based on borrowed ideas, on the intellectual resources of a foreign culture, on the slavish, cramping and debilitating use of foreign language. It is therefore imperative as Iqbal posits that that we need to breaks this spell and must break the spell, to look upon the world not only through borrowed lenses and glasses, but through the eyes of others. Education has, in its turn, complacently worked towards this consummation, not realizing that it was and is undermining and, has undermined all national self – respect and blocks and has blocked people's creative impulses. It is important to therefore note and explicitly understand, he says that when education is organized under the inspiration of a new and healthy ideology, it will aim at the strengthening of people's individuality and, will revitalize sources of national culture and will also use its riches to quicken creative activity. It is the question of true individuality, which is freedom. In other words Iqbal outlines and indicates man's rise from a primitive state of instinctive appetite to the conscious possession of a free self, capable of doubt and disobedience. The unfolding of an individual's latent possibilities can best take place in an atmosphere of freedom and that deprived freedom makes man a slave and one incapable of original creative activity. Iqbal, therefore, projects on the freedom of creativity for problems of intellectual and moral education. It is the perpetual expansion of knowledge based on actual experience of trial and error. Error is an indispensible factor in building up of experience. It allows for exploration into new realms of thought for the enrichment of knowledge and consequently to life. 
Such a view by Iqbal in respect of intellectual education, therefore calls for the rejection of all those elaborate, strictly logical and full-proof graded methods of teaching which seek to eliminate, from the process of student learning, all possibility of exercising intellectual initiative and ingenuity, of making mistakes, and learning from them. It is obvious that intellectual education can become an effective influence in life when it takes into account the intelligent and purposeful character of life and experience. The object of this intellectual education should be the awakening of the critical and questioning attitude which would refuse to take everything on trust. That is why intellectual curiosity and the search for truth are more important, from the point of view, than truth itself. However, Iqbal is not consumed into the blind worship of the intellect which gives a one-sided view of reality to Western thinkers and which minimizes the comparative value and importance of action in the eyes of so many of the thinkers in the East. In other word he says that we do not live in order to think but we think in order to live. If knowledge is not allied to, and acquired through action, it cannot be transformed into power. And man cannot use it for reconstruction of his environment. It cannot therefore be mere bookish knowledge, academic knowledge which often saps the student's vitality and fails to equip the student for life of active striving in the service of worthy causes. It cannot be the end of the educative process. In this regard Iqbal says that, it is the active quest, the yearning for achievement which gives vitality to knowledge and life. That is why he is at one with modern thinkers who sound a note of warning against an over intellectualistic conception of education and holds a balance view which gives due weight to all the elements of experience, cognitive, 
conative and affective, which make up the variegated texture of life.

On the other hand the implications of the doctrine of freedom are equally important for moral education also. The traditional conception and methods of moral training have demanded a passive conformity on the part of an individual to a rigid, superimposed moral code and they have tended to belittle the role of personal thought and active intellect in the process of achieving a moral personality. Iqbal, takes a different view in that, goodness is not a matter of compulsion; it is the self-free surrender to the moral ideal and arises out of a willing co-operation and thus freedom is seen to be a condition of goodness. What this means is that, education cannot produce or stimulate genuine moral behaviour by teaching a set of ready-made moral maxims which students are to act upon mechanically and without question. Morality involves choice and free will. In social intercourse, theoretical moral maxims cannot be transformed into persistent motive forces of conduct. Morality cannot be taught or learnt in isolation; it arises out of the willing co–operation which implies that schools must provide opportunities for social life and social experience and must utilize in their teaching the healthy motives which operate in community living. All the educational movements which introduce social motives and methods of work in schools and offer scope for work done on a co – operative basis tend to moralize the process of education and should, therefore be welcomed.

It is obvious, therefore, that when the repressive forces of the environment or of a blind educational system discourage the formation of new desires, ideals and purposes or when the repressive discipline of an absolute all-powerful State imposes its own ready-made purposes 
on every citizen, the development of a free, creative and unique individuality becomes impossible and one of the most important objectives of education is defeated. It is therefore, essential, in the interest of a right and effective education that the teacher should awaken in his 
students a keen consciousness of their relations with the environment and for all intents and purposes this should lead to the formation of new and creative purposes. These purposes, however, are not formed in a vacuum; they grow out of dynamic, forward-moving activity which brings the individual into a fruitful, manipulative relation with the environment. From this follows that, if education is to be a preparation for life, it must be achieved through active participation in life, a principle which, has brought about far reaching changes not only in the theory but also in the practice and technique of education.

Of Man's Ego in Himself and Environment 
The concept of individual is equal to the concept of ego in the philosophy of Muhammad Iqbal. In this regard, Iqbal's ego which has been quoted by Saiyidain is the object of the educator's attention. Ego of human being is a real and preeminently significant entity which is the center and basis of the entire organization of human life. Essentially, the living intimacy of this relationship between the two should be utilized in education. Through this give-and-take between the individual and his many sided environment, through establishing as many intensive and fruitful contacts with the surrounding reality as possible, the individual evolves the inner richness of his being. A life of solitary, self sufficient contemplation, which cuts him off from the stimulus and energizing current of social life, is apt to make him egocentric and limited in his interests and sympathies.

Iqbal who has been quoted by Saiyidain takes a dynamic view of this continuous process of adjustment between the individual and the environment and points out that it is the lot of man to share in the deeper aspirations of the universe around him and to shape his own destiny as well as that the universe. By adjusting himself to its forces, he is putting the whole of his energy to mould its forces to his own end and purpose. In this process of progressive change, God becomes a co-worker with him and He provides man with the initiatives. This basic concept of education is based on the teaching of the Quran, "Verily, God will not change the condition of  men, till they change what is in themselves."

Individual Adrift in Reality 
Mehr Abdul Haq further explained that a person can study the ultimate nature of reality only by identifying himself with the course which reality adopts in its various manifestations. The human being born with the breath of God or the rationalizing spirit in him is always ready to seek unity in all apparent complexities. But the man of the world looks after his own business and leaves all questioning and answering to philosophers who generally get little approbation for the pains they take. Even then it has always been one mastermind endowed with far superior powers of insight and foresight, whose inspiration and right guidance has steered the ship of humanity gone adrift in troubled waters through to the shore of safety. As matter of fact, all knowledge, being love of wisdom, was one whole in the beginning. With the increase in the bulk of knowledge philosophy is differentiated from science. The word science, with its Sanskrit root word Sanyas (searching herbs to cure bodily diseases), refers to the application of knowledge to its use in man's practical life. But later science itself differentiated into many sciences and even philosophy branched out into a number of studies. Today knowledge has become so vast that it is impossible to lump it together into one whole. Philosophy, as matter of fact, is the mother of all sciences, but due to vast cleavages in the thinking of the Western nations and their materialistic approach to the over increasing problems of life, it has, unfortunately lost much 
of its importance. We must not lose sight of the fact that a philosopher, be he right or wrong, is satisfying an in born hunger for knowledge and is indispensable.

Islamic Education 
In elaborating the philosophy of Islamic education, the view of Rosnani Hashim infers from her book entitled Education Dualism in Malaysia. To her, it is a well-known principle that education is one of the means through which a particular society transmits and renews its culture and values to the next generation. According to William Frankena, education is the transmission or acquisition of the excellence (desirable abilities, habits, states and traits) by the use of techniques like instruction, training, studying, practice, guidance and discipline. Consequently, it is natural that educational principles and content are drawn from the cultural values of the society. The ends and goals of society will determine the ends and goals of education. A society that prizes democratic ideals will dictate this value as one of its major goals of education. By the same token, since Muslim society derives its basic principles of life from the Quran, it is logical that the Islamic philosophy of education be derived from the same source. Basically, the literary meaning of philosophy is a compound word, derived from the Greek. It is compound of “philo”, lover of or “friend of” and “sophy” is wisdom (or knowledge). In common usage the word philosophy stands for love of wisdom (or knowledge) especially that which deals with ultimate reality or with the most general causes and principles of things. It also means system for conduct of life, serenity and resignation.

Social order of Islam 
The concentration on the education of the individual character as was envisaged by Iqbal. The individual is but one pole of the process of education. The entire social order, including the world of nature and its environs is the other pole. The function of education is therefore, to bring about a progressive interaction and dynamic adjustment between them. The school, using the term to include all kinds of educational institutions, is only one of the numerous factors which determine the course and direction of the individual's development. It is far more powerfully and irresistibly influenced by the nature of the environing society and the ideology which inspires its group relationships and its social, political and economic life. What then is the conception of the social order implicit in Iqbal's thought? What kind of society does he visualize in which his fully developed individual will be able to play his part effectively, without being frustrated at every step by adverse social conditions? What is the social order which will favour and stimulate the growth of such an individual?

In the attempt to analyze this social order the sources of Iqbal's inspiration must be looked for in the teachings of Islam. In other words the Prophet Muhammad's conception of Islam. The issue that requires some reflection is Iqbal's desire, to resurrect the values of Islam, a reactionary step, a counsel of obscurantism? The question demands an unbiased and dispassionate examination of these social values and a mental readiness to take them on their merits, not rejecting them merely because they are old and derive their sanction from religion, nor accepting them unquestioningly on the same ground, but evaluating them with reference to actually existing social conditions and problems. He has constantly stressed in his works the fact of change and the dynamic nature of human society. On the other hand he stressed historic continuity. Life he further stated was not change, pure and simple but has within it elements of conservation also. No people can afford to reject their past entirely; for it is their past that has made their personal identity. This is only a philosophical argument for not rejecting the experience and institutions of the past and present; for the acceptance and affirmation of Islamic institutions as valuable for the modern age. He has more positive reasons to offer. He did not confine himself or his works to Islam but, was keenly interested in the search for a better social order. It is therefore, impossible to ignore the existing social system because his main object was and is to abolish all distinction of race, caste and colour. These issues according to Iqbal should not be dividing factors because of the rising tide of racialism and nationalism. His works therefore provide the greatest guarantee and hope of a society based on the principles of equality, social justice and human brotherhood, in order to build a social order on the broadest humanistic basis. It must be acknowledged and appreciated that Iqbal was in many ways socialized by Islam being a Muslim and therefore, the extraordinary and remarkable personality of Prophet Muhammad provides another important focus of his loyalties for the growing polity of Islam and, its importance to the modern world and, this emotional concentration is and was a powerful means for transforming Muslims and the world into a vital and unified community. On the other hand this must be intertwined with the real significance of Muhammad's prophethood, which lies in the nature of the message which was offered to mankind, enslaved in cruel bonds of its own making; a message of freedom, social equality and human brotherhood, an affirmation for the first time in history, in unequivocal terms, of complete equality of social status and legal rights. It restored to the full status of citizenship those who had been deprived of their human rights on the grounds of race or colour or sex or social and economic circumstances. These aspects still remain perplexing issues in a modern and so – called civilized world. It is an indictment to modern civilization, in a world that has offered little hope to unity and in dealing with racial discrimination, poverty, and overt inequality. His works therefore reflected a living faith in social democracy so far as it could be practicable at the time of his writings and, bears relevance even today in a deprived and depraved world. It gave a new set of values and offered liberation to mankind, particularly to the poorer and the oppressed classes which had been kept 
under and are even today in many instances, kept under suppression by the exploiting rich and privileged elite based on patronage, who are the usurpers of political power. He pointed out poignantly how it rendered back to the people their natural rights, raised the status of the workers and weakened the power of the usurpers. This has to be reengineered once again in a modern world that has lost its way in spite of its technological advancement and, much to the disadvantage of the predominantly poor that make up the world. Thus Iqbal wrote and argued that, the social order, contemplated by Islam, throws the weight of its legislation and, its sanctions towards redressing injustices and inequalities and tends to side with the weak against the strong. By its essentially democratic spirit and by cutting across the social and economic divisions of society it has always made for the mobility of social intercourse and arrested the stratification of society into mutually exclusive groups. Any social order which rejects or ignores these conditions of social health would militate against the vision of society implicit in Iqbal's thought. On the political side, this social order definitely rejects the claims of racial and geographical factors to dictate and circumscribe people's loyalties. The exaggerated modern emphasis on territorial nationalism and aggressive patriotism is mischievous because it cuts across the international outlook of Islam and disrupts the essential solidarity of mankind. It strikes at the root of political sanity and it has been directly responsible for the bloodshed, destruction and unjust persecutions which embitter the present political situation. We recall in this regard Machiavelli who raised the State to the position of an absolute deity and openly preached the subordination of moral and ethical principles of political expediency. The pernicious practice of subjecting all values to the interests of a particular race or nation has been vigorously revived by the reactionary political systems of Fascism and Nazism or for that matter by Anglophone and Francophone colonization which was exemplified by overt superiority and racism of the apartheid regime of South Africa. In this regard Iqbal said that that these tendencies must be condemned and that the consequences of worshipping these idols of race, colour and nation are too obvious to need any detailed examination. We are living today in a veritable hell of their making. In the days of its unquestioned ascendancy, Christianity frowned upon science and tolerated a great deal of the persecution of the scientific spirit carried on its name with the result that, in the early Middle Ages, Europe found itself plunged into intellectual darkness. On the other hand the civilization of Islam stimulated and encouraged the pursuit of science to a remarkable degree, so much so that, according to Briffault, the famous historian of civilization-science is the most momentous contribution of Arab civilization to the modern world. Nowhere is this decisive influence of Islamic culture as clear and momentous as in the genesis of that power which constitutes the distinctive force of the modern world and the supreme source of its victory in natural science and the scientific spirit. Iqbal makes it abundantly clear that the strengthening and fulfilment of national life is impossible without the fullest development of science and its utilization for its growing and expanding purposes. The issue that we must raise as a question is – Can there be a more passionate advocacy of science as an essential factor in the organization of education and of life? Iqbal, in this regard insists on it strongly, because one of the main causes which have been responsible for the later decline and decadence of the Muslim peoples is their neglect of science which has arrested their intellectual growth and weakened their political and economic position which, in the present age, is mainly dependent on scientific power. Education must, therefore, endeavour to make good this deficiency. Lastly, this social order must be a dynamic order, keenly alive and responsive to the fact of change and the formative forces that are playing on it constantly. Like some great thinkers of the age, Iqbal realized very clearly that life is constantly in a state of flux; it is perpetual change or motion. He postulated cogently independent judgment and interpretation of religious law in the light of changed and changing circumstances to be essential for the healthy growth of the body politic. Iqbal, however, disagrees with those legists who would deny this right to present day Muslims. There should be 
no surrender of intellectual interdependence. The social order must not be allowed to be static. In this regard, Iqbal contends that the social order becomes static and lifeless when intellectual initiative and independent thinking become atrophied and people cling to the old and outworn ideas and forms because they do not have the courage to face and experiment with new ones. The possibilities of change Iqbal says is the greatest asset of man in his present surroundings.

Quran and Philosophy of Education 
For philosophy, the Quranic word is Hikmah, commonly translated as wisdom. Its root-word means the strap of the rein with which the jaws of a horse are tied up. This strap prevents the horse from becoming unruly or going astray. To fix the rights and obligations and thus to prevent someone from exceeding limits is Hukm. Hikmah, therefore, means to fix with justice and correct proportion the rights and obligations of men and to prevent them from transgressions. A Hakeem or philosopher will, therefore, be one who sets things right in due order and proportion, beautifully, authoritatively and with a firm belief in the correctness of his decisions. The Quran elaborated that the great educators sent by Allah to humanity as His Messengers were equipped with the following four things integrated into one discipline called Nubuwwat; law (Kitab, or the book), wisdom (Hikmah), authority (Hukm) and knowledge (‘ilm). Thus the seed of rift that the word philosophy contained in it its earlier meanings was removed and men were warned not to shift emphasis from wisdom to knowledge otherwise that would cause great detriment to human society. Its first discipline, law or the book, is the most perfect, complete and progressive way of life that gives practical training to people in keeping things in right order and correct proportion. The second discipline is wisdom, this wisdom brightens up the understanding of the essence of each law and provides man's free-will with right guidance towards an appropriate behavior. The third is authority, which is necessary to protect both law and wisdom from the onslaughts of rebellious forces of evil that work within man himself and outside of him. The fourth discipline is knowledge, which has to subdue nature for the common benefit and advancement of human society. Thus, knowledge is for the right understanding of relationships and for maintaining right order and discipline and correct proportion in them, and this ultimately leads to wisdom. Knowledge that subordinates 
do not believe itself to the divine laws of the highest wisdom is worse than useless. It has an innate tendency to swerve towards arrogance and pride, and consequently, to upset The peace and order, tranquility and freedom. This, in a nutshell, it is an essence of the Quranic philosophy of education. Its main purpose is not only to criticize existing conditions or to offer suggestions for improvement but also to check authoritatively all vagrancies of thought and behavior and to see that imbalances do not appear anywhere in relationships. As a matter of fact, it is always the philosophy of the people which determines their actions, manners, morals, values, patterns of behavior; in fact, all 
the ways of life as well as the angle of vision from which they look at other people of the world. The Quranic universals provide us with the surest and most perfect guidance in all 
matters referred to above. They suit all times and all peoples. In relation with the philosophy of Islamic education, Muhammad Munawwar further elaborated the difference between moral character as knowledge and moral character as a practical action. Goodness, good will, sacrifice, determination, steadfastness and kindliness are the qualities about which a man may know a lot, but as long as they are merely a property of intellect and not a property of soul, they are in fact, of no palpable use to him. No reforms take place in him and vistas of well-being do not open before him. Clearly, according to Muhammad Munawwar knowledge does not mean education. Man has the knowledge of good and evil, yet he does not try to reform himself. It means acquiring knowledge is a very dangerous responsibility. As a rule acquisition of knowledge should bring about a healthy change in the one who acquires it. He should become a better man commensurate with the height of the scale of his knowledge. With the depth and expansion of knowledge a man should develop his sensibilities and ideas. He must become more broad-vision, generous, forgiving, affectionate, upright, so on and so forth. Knowledge procures better weapons, and makes man more powerful. It can provide man with a comfortable and luxurious pattern of life and many things more. But all these things put together cannot be a proof of gentlemanliness of the individual who possesses them. It is quite possible that a person who lacks education in morals may put all these amenities and accessories at the service of him and hence may bring about his own ruin as well as of many others.

Knowledge Exudes Assets 
Knowledge is like other assets such as power, wealth and weapons, which is a dangerous responsibility for an uncultivated person. A cultured 
and intelligent person is more capable of rising above the scale of personal interests or likes and dislikes, than a less intelligent and less cultivated person. But without education in moral values an intelligent person, who is a lettered one too, can surely play more havoc by putting his capabilities to wrong use. Iqbal remarked this point in the 
following statement: “Vision without power does bring moral elevation but cannot give a lasting culture. Power without vision tends to become destructive and inhuman. Both must combine for the spiritual expansion of humanity”.

Creative Vision Of Education 
Iqbal talks of a dynamic and creative education, directed to the nurturing and the release of the creative spirit in man, in order to equip him with the desire and capacity to conquer new realms of art and science, knowledge and power; an education inspired by the optimistic faith in the destiny of man. Science he says must occupy a central space in it, giving man not only sovereignty over nature but control over the scientific method through which he can explore and consciously reconstruct his world. It must allow for continuity of purpose because the centrality of science in terms of the practical and intellectual significance cannot be ignored in the modern world and therefore consequently in education. It must occupy with religion a central place in any synthesis of all the data of human experience. We must not be opposed to science and has to be given a prominent place in education, for it is the most powerful source of idealism and intuitive love for humanity according to Iqbal because, it ensures that man will use his tremendous powers, for the good of man and the world. In this regard, he says that only by raising a fresh vision of his origin and future that man will eventually triumph over a society motivated by inhuman competition and a civilization that has lost its spiritual unity by an inner conflict of religious and political values. Iqbal alludes to and speaks to the justification and reaffirmation of faith in the methods of education which must stimulate self-activity and thus cultivate the will to courageous effort in behalf of great causes. In other words the significance of action is cardinal and, therefore, he says that people must not be contented with political and intellectual slavery. But at the same time he denounces ruthless efficiency as was experienced during the age of the puritan work ethic and, the preoccupation with trivial, pointless activity which ignores the appreciation of life. Man must he says make a distinction between the efficient and the effective self which is of great significance for education. Finally, education must be conducted in the most liberal and broad-minded spirit so as to give the generation of youth a definite bias in favour of an all-embracing humanity, and a truly international outlook and to arrest the growth of narrow, political, racial or geographical, loyalties. However, it must appreciate group culture and indeed group psychology, it must act as a bulwark against modern forces of obscurantism which, under the names of nationalism or patriotism, or purity of blood and race or carrying the white man's burden which and are undermining international peace and thus setting at naught all principles of justice and humanity.

Iqbal has postulated that – can education build a world worthy for man's habitation? This is Iqbal's challenge to mankind and is captured in one of his poems as follows:

This world which is a riot of colour and sound,
This world which is under the sway of Death;
This world which is an idol – house of sight and sound,
Where life is naught but eating and drinking;
It is only the first stage in the perfection of the ego,
Traveller! It is not the goal;
Forge ahead, shattering this great obstruction,
Conquering this illusion of space and time;
There are many worlds still unborn,
For the mind of Existence is not a void;
All are awaiting thy triumphant advance,
And the subtlety of thy thought and action;
What is the purpose if this whirligging of Time?
That thy Ego may be revealed to thee! 
Thou art the conqueror of the world of Good and Evil,
I dare not reveal thy great destiny;
My heart is aflame with the light of inspiration,
But the power of my speech confesses its defeat;
“If I step further even by a hair's breadth,
The glaring light will burn up my soaring wings.”

Education as the Intellectual Periphery 
According to Saiyidain, Iqbal has repeatedly stressed the point that question, (i.e. asking dependence on others), displays the slavish imitation of their weakened self and that, unless individuals as well as the community develop self reliance and evolve the inner richness of their own being, their potentialities will remain warped and repressed. From the explanation above it is clear that the word education is closely related to the existence of man as its object and to the strong relationship between man and his environment. However, the impact of society upon the individual is another dimension to be elaborated in order to elucidate the term education in general. Society, according to Sayyid Sajjad Rizavi, can change the behavior of individuals, who constitute it, in so far as it liberates and limits the activities of men and sets up standards for them for being followed and maintained. This change in the behavior of the individuals, which brings them closer to the collective norms, necessitates the existence of any agency through which influences from without the individual affect his behavior and orientate it towards desired as well as desirable goals and objectives.

Unless the behavior of individuals is changed according to the genus of the society and molded into a type, generally needed and approved by the social order, the society cannot perpetuate itself. This process of changing their behavior of individuals starts very early, immediately right after their birth. Known as socialization, it is both a molding and creating process, in which the group tries to bear upon the child, and in which the individual's thoughts, feelings and behavior gradually and continually change and develop in accordance with the values set by the society. Society exists through a process of transmission quite as much as biological life. This transmission occurs by means of communication of habits of doing, thinking and feeling from the older to the younger. This transmission is necessary to acquaint the child with what is desirable, followed and respected by the society so that he may have a frame of reference to judge his actions and try to conform to the accepted norms of the society. In order to build up and maintain a society, not only do we need a change in the behavior of a newly born child, but also have to develop a sense of social adjustment among its members.

Life Skill based Education 
The philosophy has an enduring role of clarification of concepts regarding knowledge, truth, beauty, mind, meaning and existence. It's important task also includes explaining the educational concepts and the relevant concept like teaching, learning, schooling, child rearing and indoctrination. All educational activities depend upon philosophical assumptions. Almost all the life skills are found in the educational philosophy of Iqbal. The widespread message of Iqbal shows individuals the exercises of sympathy, social sensitivity and being concern for every single person. Iqbal considered a child like eaglet who is characterized by lofty flight, strong vision, preference for seclusion, doesn’t settle itself in a single dwelling, doesn’t feed on someone else's prey. For Iqbal the learner looks like the Eaglet and it is the obligation of the instructors and the enlightening structure to give them strong wings to take off high.

The accompanying refrain is the sharp delineation of Iqbal's anguish at the common instructive framework. In this manner, he says: "O lord I have a grumbling against instructors, for they are showing the eaglets to cower in the residue". Iqbal wanted that education which inculcates inevitable skills in children through education. Iqbal used his pen like a sword to pierce the darkness that was embedded in the hearts and the minds of people. As indicated by Iqbal self has dynamic power other than adoration as a fundamental element for the improvement of self. Iqbal upheld arrangement of instruction wealthy in its suggestions with expansive based educational programs in order to uphold national – confidence and global comprehension. In his perspective of instruction there is the wrong spot for the uninvolved training. On the off chance that learning is inactive and dormant, with no feeling of energy, no excite of self-satisfaction, it is the information which the bibliophile obtains by consuming the composed pages. Iqbal recognizes two sorts of learning, one consuming with enthusiasm and the other simply covered in books. In his words:"Knowledge is an instrument for the safeguarding of life; Knowledge is a means of building upself".

Life skill is described as promoting a psychological competence. It is the reflection of affective skill of an individual. The term adaptive in the definition indicates the flexibility and versatility in the attitude of an individual rather than a person who is adjustable in different situations. Whereas the term positive behavior means that an individual even in difficult situations can find a silver lining and can have a streak of luck to find solution to the problems. World Health Organization has laid down ten key life skills as under:
 Self- Awareness: It often forms the basic requirement for effective communication, interpersonal relations and for developing empathy with others. As the name indicates self awareness means to know one's own self which constitutes knowing one's characters, strengths, desires, needs, likes and dislikes. According to Iqbal purification of heart is the first and foremost step to acquire self awareness.
 Empathy: Nature has made us bound in relations. We are social animals growing up with our kith and kin and other social members at large. A prosperous relation is possible only by understanding and caring for others. A healthy relationship is built by two way traffic. One needs to take care of others feelings and needs as well. If we try to comprehend ours and others feelings, we can better prepare to catch the attention of others towards our needs and desires as well. It helps us to communicate our problems and issues with each other easily. It inculcates the quality of acceptance in us. We readily learn to accept the people even in the situations of ethnic and cultural diversity. The widespread message of Iqbal shows individuals the exercises of compassion, social affectability and worry for every single person in the society.
 Critical thinking: This thinking allows a person to evaluate and analyze information objectively to form a judgment. Critical thinking is among the first causes of change. According to Iqbal the objective of intellectual education emphasized by him should be the awakening of critical and questioning attitude."They don't serve who just stand and pause". This was his conviction. His graceful images were Hawk and Eagle speaking to the life of aspiration, battle and activity framing the cornerstone of the entire structure of life. A man must have close contact with his surroundings and he ought to steadily reshape it to suit his motivation. The great man must make sense of how to apply his knowledge. Through intelligence he can take course over nature. He is of the view that training ought to develop strength, resistance and ‘Faqr’. Man learns through firsthand experience. Making of mistakes turns into a piece of man's developing background, on the off chance that it is combined with an intelligent desire to learn. In this way the error which may be depicted as a kind of insightful extreme aversion (evil) is an essential factor in the working up of experience.
 Creative Thinking: Thinking characterized by fluency, flexibility, originality and elaboration calls for new ways of viewing and acting. As per Allama educational system should inculcate a spirit of creativity in children so that students learn to dive in the vast horizon of scientific knowledge including the knowledge of the arts. Iqbal sought to discover instruction as a ceaseless practice to achieve the elevated amounts of Khudi. As shown by Iqbal's enlightening thinking the immense life must be the life of dynamic effort and fight. The activity must be creative and novel since creative ability is the most imperative and most undeniable gift. He upbraided self-invalidation and renunciation which were the immediate consequence of defeatism.
 Decision Making: It is a mental process dealing constructively with choosing of an action among many options. Iqbal always emphasized moral way where a person can judge between right and wrong.
 Problem Solving: It is the cognitive process where one tries to find solutions to the difficult situations. Iqbal always emphasized creativity in children. Creativity is always helpful in problem solving. Moreover when adolescence would concentrate and are aware of human values like value of the right action, value of love, value of peace, value of truth, value of non violence. In their daily life they would strive to become valuable person and can have meaning to their life. When they are know how to live with right human values and moral qualities they will be able to set targets and goals for their life. This problem solving ability is yet another skill that comes in the package of life skills education.
 Effective communication: Clear expression both verbally and nonverbally as per culture and circumstance calls for effective communication. It is an important interpersonal skill. Iqbal communicates through his poetry and inspires. He considers educators to be skilled workers whose job is to make the best out of crude material given to them.
 Interpersonal relationship: This relationship is characterized by close coordination between two or more members. It implies having a sound relationship between family members which is a great source of social support. Iqbal in Rumuz-e-Bekhudi emphasized that a person must keep his individual character intact. Man cannot realize the self outside of society. The main theme of some of his poems was ideal community, Islamic ethical and social principles and relationship between the individuals. As per Iqbal confidence and love assumes a noteworthy job toward this path. Love is the establishment of life. Love is the glimmering sword of death. The hardest rocks are shuddered by cherishes glace. Straightforwardness and virtue of heart is one of the subjects generally managed by Iqbal. It is love that refines the heart, tidies it up, and clears it from tediously trash. He considered heart seat of sentiments and feelings focal point of human interiority, the most significant seat of mindfulness. In this way its decontamination is simply the premier advance mindfulness. The method for moving toward oneself is correspondence with one self. A man is simply the best judge and by addressing himself, he knows his shortcomings. This is a piece of the way toward tidying up the heart, which includes the hard battle against contradicting outside which hauls the person towards wrong way. In this way one can keep himself inside the standards of profound quality and religious points of confinement.
Coping with stress: It means to be aware of the source that causes stress in one's life. To learn to control the levels of stress by adjustment or by changing our ways of spending life. Iqbal always advised the youngsters to have courage. Courage is the instrument that saves a person in hard time when a person feels stress and strain in life.
 Coping with emotions: To know emotions within us is an inevitable concern for humans. One should recognize as well as learn to control emotions. Intense emotions like anger and sadness if not responded properly can have a negative impact on health of a person. Iqbal considered heart seat of feelings and emotions focus of human interiority, the most profound seat of awareness. Iqbal always guided the children to learn tolerance. Tolerance power in an individual saves from indulging in extreme out bursts of emotions like anger etc. To Iqbal life is a steady streaming waterway, it has no start and no end, its start and also ends lie in time everlasting. The rest isn't in its tendency. The rest implies passing and demise is no place in the life of oneself. Iqbal was in fact an incredible reformer who offered changing thoughts as well as observed his life as a mission to manage the general population of his nation towards the right way. His last objective was to make an acknowledgment of the significance of the aggregate self at a more elevated amount in the general public of humankind in general. He made himself a genuine power of progress in the general public and touched off the intensity of aggregate self inside his comrades. Iqbal emphatically trusts that instruction without preparing is pointless, so he says, "Such learning is shallow/limited which does not illuminate the searcher and nature like Musa (alyhisaalam) and prohibit significant philosophical recognition."

See also 
 Index of Muhammad Iqbal–related articles

References

Further reading

External links 

Muhammad Iqbal
Education theory
Educational research
Religion and education
Education studies
Education activism
Works about education